Lewis and Clark Landing is a public park located at 515 North Riverfront Drive in Downtown Omaha, Nebraska. The  park is situated along the eight-foot-tall (2.4 m) river walk of the Missouri River just north of U.S. Interstate 480.

History 
The Lewis and Clark Expedition took place from 1804 to 1806. The purpose of the expedition was to explore the land which the United States had purchased from France through the Louisiana Purchase in 1803. Lewis and Clark Landing is the original landing site of the expedition on the west bank of the Missouri River. Lewis and Clark Landing now sits on property formerly owned by ASARCO, which maintained a lead refinery there that closed in 1997. HDR Inc. won an award from the United States Environmental Protection Agency for their work on remediation of the Lewis and Clark Landing. Beginning in the summer of 2020, the park area will be temporarily closed as part of a $300 million riverfront revitalization project that also includes the Gene Leahy Mall and Heartland of America Park, although Abbott Drive and the Martin Luther King Jr. Pedestrian Bridge will remain open during the renovation. The park is expected to reopen in early 2023.

Features 

The park has a number of distinct features including as a walking trail which follows the riverfront and a bike trail which takes riders west to Miller's Landing and another trail which leads to the Heartland of America Park. The Martin Luther King Jr. Pedestrian Bridge, with interpretive exhibits, connects to CenturyLink Center Omaha. The park also includes the Omaha Firefighter's Memorial Monument and the second largest labor monument in the United States. The park contains a walking trail which follows the riverfront and sections of a bike trail that connect to Omaha's bike trail system.  The walking trail also connects to the Bob Kerrey Pedestrian Bridge that spans the river and joins Omaha with Council Bluffs, Iowa. There is expansive area for festivals and events and there are a number of tables with umbrellas and chairs that offer a chance to relax and take in the riverfront experience. Additional attractions include a "Monument to Labor" sculpture, Lewis and Clark interpretive exhibits, jumping fountains where children can play, and a historical marker on site.

The park is immediately down the trail from Omaha's new National Park Service Regional Headquarters. The office houses the superintendent of the Lewis and Clark National Historic Trail.

Entertainment
Every summer the Landing and Heartland of America Park host a free concert series. The Annual Playing with Fire concerts began in 2004.

See also
 Parks in Omaha, Nebraska
 History of Omaha, Nebraska

References

External links
 Omaha Riverfront news

Parks in Omaha, Nebraska
History of Downtown Omaha, Nebraska
Pre-statehood history of Nebraska
Lewis and Clark Expedition
Asarco
2003 establishments in Nebraska